Dinnetherium is an extinct genus of morganucodont mammaliaform that is part of the monotypic order Dinnetheria and is also part of the monotypic family Dinnetheriidae. The type species, D. nezorum, was named in 1983. It was discovered in a Sinemurian layer of the Kayenta Formation, within the Gold Spring Quarry 1, in Arizona. The holotype is MNA V3221, which is a partial right mandible.

References

Morganucodonts
Prehistoric cynodont genera
Sinemurian life
Jurassic Arizona
Fossils of the United States
Paleontology in Arizona
Fossil taxa described in 1983